Kubilay Türk Yilmaz (born 9 July 1996) is an Austrian professional footballer of Turkish origin who plays as a forward for SK Vorwärts Steyr of the Austrian Second League.

Club career

Early career
As a youth player, he joined the youth academy of Rapid Wien.

Spartak Trnava
Yilmaz was signed by Spartak Trnava in January 2017.  He made his professional Slovak league debut for Trnava against Zemplín Michalovce on 21 February 2017.

Personal life
He was born in Turkey. His family moved to Vienna shortly after his birth. Yilmaz is a native speaker of Turkish and German and speaks Czech, Slovak and English fluently.

Honours 
Spartak Trnava
 Fortuna Liga: 2017–18
 Slovnaft Cup: 2018–19

References

External links
 FC SpartaK Trnava official club profile 
 
 Eurofotbal profile 
 Futbalnet profile 

1996 births
Living people
People from Sakarya Province
Austrian footballers
Austrian expatriate footballers
Austrian people of Turkish descent
Association football forwards
SK Rapid Wien players
1. SC Znojmo players
FC Spartak Trnava players
Yeni Malatyaspor footballers
Boluspor footballers
Menemenspor footballers
FC ViOn Zlaté Moravce players
MFK Zemplín Michalovce players
Slovak Super Liga players
Czech National Football League players
TFF First League players
Expatriate footballers in the Czech Republic
Austrian expatriate sportspeople in the Czech Republic
Expatriate footballers in Slovakia
Austrian expatriate sportspeople in Slovakia
Expatriate footballers in Turkey
Austrian expatriate sportspeople in Turkey
Expatriate footballers in Poland
Austrian expatriate sportspeople in Poland